Gordon Gallant (born October 27, 1950) is a retired professional ice hockey player who played 273 games in the World Hockey Association.  He played for the Quebec Nordiques, Minnesota Fighting Saints, and Birmingham Bulls and played with the 1972-1973 EHL Syracuse Blazers

References 

1950 births
Canadian ice hockey centres
Quebec Nordiques (WHA) players
Minnesota Fighting Saints players
Birmingham Bulls players
Living people
People from Shediac
Ice hockey people from New Brunswick
Acadian people